A Blowout at Santa Banana is a 1914 American silent comedy-drama short film starring Sydney Ayres, Vivian Rich, and Harry Van Meter. The film was shot in Santa Barbara by the American Film Manufacturing Company, aka Flying "A" Studios, and released by Mutual Film.

Plot 
Three guardsmen are asked to bring a ton of fireworks to Santa Banana for a big Fourth of July celebration. Overnight, they're intercepted by bandits and decide to set off all the fireworks in an attempt to escape their captors. When they arrive back home without the fireworks, they're forced to decide whether to face death by hanging or be married to three elderly women.

Cast
 Sydney Ayres
 Vivian Rich
 Harry Van Meter
 Perry Banks
 Charlotte Burton
 Edith Borella
 Caroline Cooke
 Julius Frankenburg
 Jacques Jaccard
 Louise Lester
 Charles Morrison
 Violet Neitz
 Jack Richardson
 William Tedmarsh

References

External links

1914 films
1914 comedy-drama films
1910s English-language films
American silent short films
American black-and-white films
1914 short films
Films directed by Lorimer Johnston
1910s American films
Silent American comedy-drama films
Comedy-drama short films